Andymon. Eine Weltraum-Utopie (Andymon. A Space Utopia) is a 1982 East German science fiction novel by Angela and Karlheinz Steinmüller. It was ranked as the most popular East German science fiction novel in a 1989 poll.

Notes and references

References 
 David Draut. Zwiespältige Zukunftsvisionen. Das Autorenpaar Steinmüller und die ostdeutsche utopische Science Fiction. Tectum, Marburg, 2014. .

External links

1982 science fiction novels
German science fiction novels
East German novels
1982 German novels
Utopian novels
Space colonization literature